Daviesia discolor is a species of flowering plant in the family Fabaceae and is endemic to Queensland. It is a glabrous, multi-stemmed shrub with linear, more or less sickle-shaped phyllodes, and yellow and dark red flowers.

Description

Taxonomy and naming
Daviesia discolor was first formally described in 1977 by Leslie Pedley in the journal Austrobaileya. The specific epithet (discolor) means "variegated".

Distribution and habitat
This species of pea grows in open forest on ridges, slopes and creek banks in the Blackdown Tableland National Park, near Biggenden and in the Carnarvon National Park.

Conservation status
Daviesia discolor is listed as "vulnerable" under the Australian Government Environment Protection and Biodiversity Conservation Act 1999 and the Queensland Government Nature Conservation Act 1992.

References

discolor
Flora of Queensland
Plants described in 1977